Founded in 1999 by Chairman Thomas S. Ricketts(also Executive Chairman of the Chicago Cubs), Incapital LLC is a distributor, underwriter and educator of securities and risk management investments. Since its inception, the firm has represented over 300 issuing entities and currently serves more than 800 distribution partners including broker-dealers, banks, wealth managers and institutional investors.

Incapital was founded to provide securities firms and individual investors more efficient access to corporate bonds. While Incapital's expertise in underwriting and distributing investment-grade corporate bonds remains a core competency, the firm now originates and/or distributes offerings across multiple asset classes including corporate retail notes (InterNotes) market-linked products, agencies, mortgage-backed securities, certificates of deposit, preferred stock and baby bonds.

Incapital is a privately held firm with roughly 150 employees. It is headquartered in Chicago, Illinois and has a primary office in Boca Raton, Florida.

References

Financial services companies of the United States
Brokerage firms
Fixed-income securities
Companies based in Chicago